{{DISPLAYTITLE:C9H16O2}}
The molecular formula C9H16O2 may refer to:

 Allyl hexanoate
 4-Hydroxynonenal
 Nonalactones
 cis-3-Methyl-4-octanolide
 trans-3-Methyl-4-octanolide
 δ-Nonalactone
 γ-Nonalactone